Iszkáz is a village in the Devecser District of Veszprém County, Hungary.

Notable figure
István Ágh (born 1938), poet, born István Nagy in Iszkáz

External links
Street map (Hungarian)

Populated places in Veszprém County